The Guitarra de golpe is a stringed musical instrument from Mexico. It has 5 nylon strings in 5 courses. The headstock traditionally has a traditional shape that is designed to look like a stylised owl with wooden pegs, but nowadays this is sometimes replaced with a guitar or vihuela style headstock with machine heads. For a while during the 20th century, the Guitarra De Golpe fell into disuse in traditional Mariachi groups, and was replaced by the Classical guitar. It has now however been revived. It is still an essential part of the "conjuntos de arpa" from Michoacán.  

Like the vihuela, it often only has a few frets, but unlike the Vihuela, the frets are made of metal or wood, instead of the vihuela's tied on nylon.

Tuning

Standard Michoacán tuning: D3, G3, C4, E3, A3.

Tecalitlán tuning: D3, G3, B4, E3, A3.

Urbana Arriba tuning: G3, C4, E4, A3, D4.

Urbana Abajo tuning: G3, C4, E3, A3, D4.

Vihuela tuning: A3, D3, G3, B4, E3.

Names
The Guitarra de Golpe has many names.
 Guitarra de Golpe: Golpe is the name of the strumming pattern used for this and other Mexican instruments. 
 Guitarra Colorada: Translates as 'red guitar'. The literal translation is "colored guitar".
 Quinta De Golpe: Fifth strum.
 Mariachera: A reference to Mariachi music.

References

External links
 ATLAS of Plucked Instruments 
 JaliscoHarp.com-guitarra de golpe

Guitar family instruments
Mexican musical instruments